Hisonotus armatus is a species of catfish in the family Loricariidae. It is native to South America, where it occurs in the Lagoa dos Patos basin in Brazil. The species is found in slow and moderate-flowing waters over sandy substrates with submerged or marginal vegetation. It reaches 6 cm (2.4 inches) in total length and is noted to be sympatric with the species Hisonotus laevior throughout its distribution.

References 

Otothyrinae
Catfish of South America
Fish described in 2008